Carex idahoa is a tussock-forming species of perennial sedge in the family Cyperaceae. It is native to western parts of North America.

See also
List of Carex species

References

idahoa
Taxa named by Liberty Hyde Bailey
Plants described in 1896
Flora of California
Flora of Idaho
Flora of Montana
Flora of Oregon
Flora of Utah
Flora of Wyoming